Hesperesta geminella is a moth of the family Autostichidae. It is found in Spain and North Africa (Algeria).

The wingspan is about 4.5 mm  for males and 7–8 mm for females. The forewings are white or creamy white. The hindwings are whitish.

References

Moths described in 1915
Hesperesta